Cyperus albus is a species of sedge that is native to southern parts of Africa.

See also 
 List of Cyperus species

References 

albus
Plants described in 1828
Flora of South Africa
Flora of Botswana
Flora of Namibia
Flora of Swaziland